William Malbank (also William de Malbanc and William II de Malbank) ( 1125 – 1176) William Malbank was a Norman landowner who was the third Baron of Wich Malbank, now known as Nantwich, in Cheshire. His grandfather of the same name was the first Baron.

Biography
The son of Hugh Malbank, 2nd Baron, and his wife, Petronilla, he held substantial lands in and around the salt town of Nantwich, amounting to much of the Nantwich hundred. His father founded Combermere Abbey in Cheshire in around 1133, and William Malbank is known to have confirmed the foundation and added further gifts.

Little else is recorded of his life. His wife Andilicia probably died early in the reign of Henry II. They had no male heirs and, on his death, his lands and the privileges of the Nantwich barony were divided between his three daughters. Philippa, the eldest, inherited Nantwich Castle as part of her share of the town. She married Thomas Basset of Headington in Oxfordshire. The second daughter, Eleanor, did not marry; her lands were granted to Henry de Audley. Auda (also Adena), the youngest daughter, married Warin (also Warren) de Vernon; their daughter Auda (also Aldetha) brought Sandon in Staffordshire by marriage to Sir William Stafford, a member of the great baronial family of Stafford Castle.

See also
Malbon, the modern version of the Malbank surname

Footnotes

References
Hall J. A History of the Town and Parish of Nantwich, or Wich Malbank, in the County Palatine of Chester (2nd edn) (E.J. Morten; 1972)

1120s births
1176 deaths
Anglo-Normans